The 1989 Supercopa Libertadores Finals was a two-legged football series between Independiente and Boca Juniors to decide the 1989 Supercopa Libertadores champion. The matches were played on November 22 and November 29 of that same year.

In the first leg, held in La Bombonera, both teams tied 0–0. The second leg was held in La Doble Visera, where both clubs also tied 0–0. As both teams equaled on points, a penalty shoot-out had to be carried out to decide a winner. Boca Juniors won 5–3 on penalties to claim their first Supercopa Libertadores title.

Qualified teams

Road to the final

Match details

First leg

Second leg

References

1
Football in Buenos Aires
Football in Avellaneda
s
s
Supercopa Libertadores Finals 1989
Supercopa Libertadores Finals